Kasey McAteer (born 22 November 2001) is an English footballer who plays as a midfielder for EFL League Two side AFC Wimbledon on loan from Premier League club Leicester City.

Club career
McAteer joined the Leicester City Academy at the age of 8. He made his Premier League debut as an 88th minute substitute for James Maddison during a 4–0 win against Newcastle United on 12 December 2021.

On 28 January 2022, McAteer joined League Two leaders Forest Green Rovers on loan until the end of the 2021–22 season. He made his debut for the club in a 1–1 draw against Port Vale on 1 February 2022.

On 31 January, 2023 McAteer joined AFC Wimbledon on a six-month loan deal.

Career statistics

Honours

Forest Green Rovers
League Two: 2021–22

Notes

References

2001 births
Living people
English footballers
Association football midfielders
Footballers from Northampton
Premier League players
English Football League players
Leicester City F.C. players
Forest Green Rovers F.C. players